Tikhy is a rural locality (a settlement) in Aksayskoye Rural Settlement, Oktyabrsky District, Volgograd Oblast, Russia. The population was 38 as of 2010.

Geography 
Tikhy is located 42 km northeast of Oktyabrsky (the district's administrative centre) by road. Kamenka is the nearest rural locality.

References 

Rural localities in Oktyabrsky District, Volgograd Oblast